Qarah Tulki-ye Olya (also Romanized as Qarah Tūlkī-ye ‘Olyā and Qareh Tūlkī-ye ‘Olyā; also known as Ghareh Tavakol Olya, Kara Tulki, and Qareh Tūlkī-ye Tāzeh Kand) is a village in Baba Jik Rural District, in the Central District of Chaldoran County, West Azerbaijan Province, Iran. At the 2006 census, its population was 43, in 8 families.

References 

Populated places in Chaldoran County